The Cuckooland Museum, previously known as the Cuckoo Clock Museum, is a museum that exhibits mainly cuckoo clocks, located in Tabley, Cheshire, England. The collection comprises 300 years of cuckoo clock-making history, since the very earliest examples made in the 18th to the 21st century.

Establishment and foundational reasons 
The museum was set up in 1990 by brothers Roman and Maz Piekarski after bringing together a collection of antique Black Forest cuckoo clocks that has been continuously increased ever since. Both men were trained as clockmakers in Manchester from the age of 15, which is when their fascination with these timepieces began.

It became apparent to them that an important part of European clock-making history was liable to disappear if surviving examples fell into irretrievable disrepair. Their guiding principles have always been to purchase objects only of the highest museum quality and which held an important significance in the historical development of cuckoo timekeeping.

In Roman Piekarski's own words: When we started collecting in the 1970s no one wanted them because battery and electric clocks were all the rage. We picked many up for next to nothing.

The collection 

In the past, the exhibition also included other kind of timepieces such as longcase, wall and bracket clocks but now focuses on cuckoo clocks especially.

The museum also hosts a range of Black Forest cuckoo and quail clocks, trumpeter clocks, monks playing bells and other associated musical movements.

Cuckooland has nowadays more than 700 cuckoo clocks on display of different styles, sizes, manufacturers and ages. Many of the timekeepers are very rare and the collection contains the best examples of the cuckoo clockmaker’s art:

 They have a "cuckoo and echo" clock that emulates the whistles and bellows the bird makes in the wild and is thought to be one of only six in the world.
 The museum also displays many timepieces made by Johann Baptist Beha, one of the most reputed, innovative and creative Black Forest clockmaker of all times.
 Examples in Art Nouveau, Arts and Crafts and other unusual styles.
 Other rarities include; picture frame cuckoo clocks, several timepieces with a life size automaton cuckoo bird on top of the case, models combined with paintings of people or animals with blinking or flirty eyes, etc.
 Designer cuckoo clocks, a series of avant-garde 21st-century creations autographed by foremost international designers such as (in alphabetical order): Christie Bassil, Lorenzo Damiani, Mattia Cimadoro, Raffaele Darra and Riccardo Paolino & Matteo Fusi.

Research and conservation 

Throughout the years, the attendance of the two brothers at clock fairs and auctions, the purchasing of specialized bibliography, trips, the internet, their own research, etc., have led them to acquire many of the clocks, gaining experience and knowledge on the subject. They document all of the aspects related to every piece of the collection in terms of: age, history, manufacturer, style, technical aspects and provenance.

One of the aims of the museum is to restore and preserve the most unusual, outstanding and unusual exemplaries to be enjoyed by future generations, as well as to contribute to the appreciation and estimation of this timepiece through its importance in horology and historic significance in the Western culture.

See also 

 Automaton
 Clock
 Horology
 List of museums in Cheshire

Similar museums
 Deutsches Uhrenmuseum
 Dorf- und Uhrenmuseum Gütenbach
 Museum fũr Uhren und Mechanische Musik
 Schwarzwaldmuseum

References

External links 
 Official website
 Interview with the museum owners
 Video tour

Museums established in 1990
Horological museums in the United Kingdom
Museums in Cheshire